Sa Kabila ng Lahat is the twelfth studio album by Filipino rock band Rivermaya. The album was released on September 15, 2017 nationwide and digital format through Star Music. This is the first album to feature bassist Nathan Azarcon after his departure in 2001 and the last album to feature drummer Ryan Peralta who left the band a year later.

Overview 
In mid-2016, the band began recording for their upcoming 13th studio at Tower of Doom Studios in Diliman, Quezon City with former member Japs Sergio co-producing the album. On May 22, 2017, the band signed with ABS-CBN-owned record label Star Music and later announced that it will release its 13th studio album. Angelo Rozul serves as the album's sound engineer
The first single, "Manila" was released on June 14, 2017. On September 7, 2017, the band released a lyric video of their second single entitled "8 to 5". They also announced that the album will be released on September 15 on all digital platforms nationwide and an album tour was also announced.

Track listing

Personnel
Rivermaya
Mark Escueta – lead vocals (tracks 4, 5, 6), backing vocals, guitars, percussion
Mike Elgar – lead vocals (tracks 3, 7), backing vocals, guitars
Nathan Azarcon – lead vocals (tracks 1, 2, 5, 8), backing vocals, bass 
Ryan Peralta – drums, percussion, keyboards

Additional musicians:
Deejay Rodriguez – additional percussion (track 2)
Anna San Juan, Symoun Durias, Miki Boado – additional backing vocals (track 2)
Raymund Fabul, Jerry Benig, Buboy Aratea, Kaka Castillo, Anna San Juan, Symoun Durias, Kyle Clayton – additional backing vocals (track 3)

Album credits 
Executive Producers: Malou N. Santos, Roxy Liquigan, Rivermaya
Co-Produced by: Kyle Clayton And Eric Perlas
Audio Content Head: Jonathan Manalo
Promo Supervisor: Jayson Sarmientoo
Promo Specialist: Jholina Luspo
Promo Associate: London Angeles
Promo Coordinators: Mela Ballano & Ron Care
Star Songs Inc, And Media Head: Marivic Benedicto
Music Publishing Officer: Abbey Alledo
Music Publishing Specialist: Luisa Ponceca
New Media Technical Assistant: Eaizen Almazan
Music Servicing Officer: Abbey Aledo
Sales And Distribution: Milette Quizon
Photography By: Dianna Capco
Additional Photography By: Raymund Fabul
Album Inlay By: Margaux Paras, Andrew Castillo
Creative Head: Andrew Castillo
Track 1 & 8 Co-Produced By: Japs Sergio
Recorded At Tower At Doom
Engineered, Mixed, And Mastering By: Kyle Clayton & Eric Perlas

References

Rivermaya albums
2017 albums
Tagalog-language albums
Star Music albums